Peter Huber (born 16 October 1967) is an Austrian diplomat who has been serving as the Ambassador of Austria to Germany since December 2017.

Early life 
Born on 16 October 1967 in Kitzbühel, Tyrol, Austria, Peter Huber attended a federal high school in St. Johann in Tirol. From 1987 to 1992, he read law at the University of Innsbruck. After that, he spent 2 years at the Diplomatic Academy of Vienna as a participant of the 29th diploma course. From 1994 to 1995, he was pursuing his Master of Laws for a year at Georgetown University in Washington, D.C., United States. In 1995, he received his doctorate in law from the University of Innsbruck.

Diplomatic career 
 January 1996: Joined the diplomatic service and was assigned to the legal and consular section of the Citizens Service
 September 1996: Transferred to the International Organizations Department
 March 1997: Dispatched to the Austrian permanent representation to the United Nations
 October 1997: Moved back to the International Organizations Department
 August 1999: Sent to the Austrian permanent representation to the UN and promoted to Counsellor
 September 2002: Became Counselor in the Austrian Embassy in Paris
 March 2005: Returned to the International Organizations department
 November 2005: Appointed as deputy head of the International Organizations department
 August 2008: Head of the International Organizations department
 April 2011: Head of office of the State Secretary in the Foreign Ministry Wolfgang Waldner
 September 2012: Head of office of the State Secretary in the Foreign Ministry Reinhold Lopatka
 January 2014: Austrian Ambassador in Madrid and dually accredited in Andorra
 December 2017: Austrian Ambassador in Berlin

References 

1967 births
Living people
Austrian diplomats
Ambassadors of Austria to Spain
Ambassadors of Austria to Germany
University of Innsbruck alumni
Georgetown University Law Center alumni